James Maddern (22 March 1914 – 27 March 1987) was an Australian cricketer. He played in five first-class matches for Queensland between 1932 and 1937.

See also
 List of Queensland first-class cricketers

References

External links
 

1914 births
1987 deaths
Australian cricketers
Queensland cricketers
Cricketers from Queensland